The Fox Theater is located at 2001 H Street in Downtown Bakersfield, California. The theater, which opened on Christmas Day, 1930, is a historic performing arts and community events center located in downtown Bakersfield, and hosts a variety of events, ranging from ballets, numerous community events, movies to contemporary pop and rock acts.

The early years 

Bakersfield's Fox Theater opened on Christmas Day, 1930, with the feature film Just Imagine, a sci-fi film set 50 years in the future.  The 1930s were a strong period for the Fox Theater.  The silver screen featured the latest "talkie" pictures, and the stage was graced by numerous acts including Bakersfield native Metropolitan Opera baritone Lawrence Tibbett (1933); world-renowned soprano Kirsten Flagstad (1939); the Los Angeles Philharmonic Orchestra (1939); and the classic pianist Arthur Rubinstein (1940).

Because of the Fox Theater's Type I construction of poured concrete over steel, the theater withstood the 1952 Kern County earthquake which shook Bakersfield and leveled many buildings throughout the city.

Theater is remodeled to Art Deco theme

The Bakersfield Fox was an early work of Los Angeles theater architect S. Charles Lee. The exterior of the building is in the Spanish Colonial Revival style, as was the original interior. The 1500 seat auditorium was designed in the "atmospheric" style popularized by architect John Eberson, and featured a plain ceiling set with small lights  to resemble stars in a night sky, while the walls were lined by decorative false walls with murals painted on the real walls behind them depicting open countryside, all meant to suggest that the auditorium was in fact a Mediterranean walled garden.

Though the building survived the earthquake of 1952 intact, the following year the interior of the theatre was remodeled. The original Mediterranean theme was replaced with an Art Moderne motif, which was the style favored by Charles Skouras, then the head of Fox-West Coast Theatres. With the re-theme, a large concession area was added to the lower lobby of the theater. In the auditorium, the "garden walls" were stripped away, and the murals painted over. The ceiling's night sky effect with its twinkling recessed star lights was retained.

A more limited remodeling of the building's exterior brought a new marquee, box office, and entrance foyer, embellished with glitzy neon signage, colorful  terrazzo flooring, and bright metals. The remodel was representative of 1950s Hollywood style and showmanship.  With this remodel, the screen was replaced with a state-of-the-art super-wide CinemaScope 20' x 45' format and the theater's projectors were upgraded with 6000-watt carbon arc lamps and anamorphic lenses.

The Fox closes

In 1977, after 47 years in business, the Fox Theater closed its doors.  The theater re-opened for a brief period in 1983 and 1984, but would fall into decay until 1994.

The Fox Theater Foundation:  Saving a historic landmark in downtown Bakersfield 

In 1994, the Fox Theater was threatened by the inevitability of demolition.  A small group of city businessmen and women joined together to save the theater, forming the Fox Theater Foundation.  The Foundation's "Save the Fox" campaign raised enough funds from over 380 donors for the down payment on the building.

Restoration began on July 1, 1994 and has been a slow, but on-going effort ever since.  A large list of restoration and improvement projects is still present for the theatre.

Executive Board of Directors
President
 Na Tesha Johnson
Vice President
 Corrine Coats
Treasurer 
 Jared Tonks
 Secretary
 Terra Johnson
 Past President
 Gilbert LaRoque

Board of Directors
Cathy Butler
John Enriquez
Melanie Farmer
Andrea Hansen
Jason Maples
Jeff Travis
Scott Fieber

Emeritus
 Janet Manning
 David Lampe
 Phyllis Adams
 Rick Davis

Fox Theater Operator
 The Fox Theater Foundation 661-324-1FOX  (1369)
 Matthew Spindler – Executive Director
 Event Tickets www.thebakersfieldfox.com, Fox Box Office or 661-324-1369

Building Owner: Fox Theater Foundation
 Office Manager
 Jacque Morovich 661-324-1369

85th anniversary celebration – 2016

On December 25, the Fox Theater celebrated its 85th Anniversary.

Walk of Stars

In early 2005, the Fox Theater Foundation launched the Walk of Stars program, a new fundraising program for the 75th Anniversary.  The program is intended to pay for the numerous ongoing restoration and facility improvement projects needed to preserve this historic structure. 
The Stars are available for purchase by any member of the community.  They are available at three different price levels, each level coming with special benefits and specific Star locations: $5,000 (14-inch stainless steel star), $10,000 (14-inch stainless steel star), $25,000 (16-inch stainless steel star).  The Stars are customized with the donor's name or company name or logo.

75th Anniversary Black Tie Gala
The Fox Theater's 75th Anniversary Black Tie Gala was a large-scale event mostly centered around nostalgia for the old theater and entertainment it has seen throughout the decades.  The evening was divided between live music inside the theater, a slideshow with live commentary by Foundation board members, and dinner and dancing to live local music acts in the Theater's large storage and maintenance building, which was partially cleared out and re-decorated for the evening.  The evening's highlight was a raffle for a $10,000 diamond pendant, to which all proceeds went the Fox Theater Foundation for bills and restoration projects.

Fox Theater events

Notable past events and performers

 Adam Carolla
 B.B. King
 Cyndi Lauper
 Earth, Wind, and Fire
 Fred Hammond
 Carlos Mencia
 Bernie Mac
 Bakersfield Ballet Theater
 Larry The Cable Guy
 Bobby “Blue” Bland
 Boz Scaggs
 Rob Thomas
 Doobie Brothers
 John Tesh
 Harry Belafonte
 Carrot Top
 Chicago
 Jewel
 Tony Bennett
 Sammy Hagar
 Gavin DeGraw
 Martina McBride
 The Go-Go's
 The Moody Blues
 Kenny Loggins
 Kid Rock
 Wayne Brady
 Jamie Foxx
 Anne Murray
 Rodney Carrington
 Huey Lewis and the News
 George Jones
 Moscow Russian Ballet
 Ray Charles
 Greg & Steve
 Toto
 George Thorogood
 Julio Iglesias
 Tom Jones
 John Fogerty
 Willie Nelson
 George Lopez
 Pauly Shore
 Cedric the Entertainer
 Paul Rodriguez
 Aly & AJ
 The Latin Kings of Comedy Tour
 Missing Persons
 Naked Eyes
 A Flock of Seagulls
 Johnny Cash
 John Leguizamo
 Lalaine
 Deon Sanders
 Tommy Chong
 Richard Elliot
 Faith Hill
 Loretta Lynn
 Tim McGraw
 Collective Soul
 Fiona Apple
 Chris Isaak
 Vince Vaughn
 Gabriel Iglesias
 Switchfoot
 Menopause: The Musical
 LeAnn Rimes
 Dwight Yoakam
 Dave Attell
 Loell Sans
 Violent Femmes
 Buck Owens
 R. Kelly
 Sir Mix A Lot
 The Black Crowes
 Merle Haggard
 Raz B
 Tina Marie
 Olivia Newton-John
 Bryan Adams
 Wall of Voodoo
 Oingo Boingo
 Gary Myrick
 Monty Byrom
 George Carlin
 My Chemical Romance
 Big House
 Blue October
 Pixies
 The Monkees
 The B52's
 Joe Rogan
 Neil Young & Crazy Horse
 Travis Tritt
 Felipe Esparza
 Jo Koy
 Los Angeles Azules
 Brit Floyd
 US Navy Sea Chanters
 Miranda Sings
 Cody Jinks
 Ronnie Milsap
 Bone Thugs-N-Harmony
 Scotty McCreery
 Aziz Ansari
 Sturgill Simpson
 Jane's Addiction
 Bill Burr
 Marisella
 Clint Black
 Iration
 Jeff Dunham
 Robin Trower
 Shinedown
 Glenn Miller Orchestra
 Ice Cube
 Kevin Smith
 Anjelah Johnson
 Bill Engvall
 Brian Regan
 Amy Grant
 The Pretenders
 John Mulaney
 Styx

Movie premieres & special screenings 
 Phenomenon  (1996)
 Windtalkers  (2002)
 Holes  (2003)
 Walkout (2006)
 Bobby (2006)
 Stamped! (2009)
 Oildale (2019)

The Fox Theater today 
Today, the Fox Theater is the heart of Downtown Bakersfield's arts and entertainment district.  The theater is home to FLICS, Bakersfield's foreign film program which runs fall through spring yearly, showcasing the best foreign film of the past year.  On Friday, September 22, 2006 FLICS celebrated its Silver Anniversary at the Fox Theater, kicking off its 25th season with the film Tristram Shandy: A Cock and Bull Story. California rock band Black Veil Brides shot a majority of the music video for their 2011 song "Rebel Love Song" in front of the Theater. The Theater also hosts numerous local dance recitals, school graduations, business meetings as well as performing arts events such as Russian ballet.

The Fox Theater's website notes:

See also
Bakersfield Register of Historic Places and Areas of Historic Interest

References

External links
 
 
 Fox Theater page by the Bakersfield Historic Preservation Commission

Buildings and structures in Bakersfield, California
Landmarks in Bakersfield, California
Cinemas and movie theaters in California
Theatres in California
Art Deco architecture in California
Tourist attractions in Bakersfield, California
Event venues established in 1930